Osterley & Spring Grove (also sometimes Osterley Park & Spring Grove) was a London Underground station in Osterley in west London. The station was served by the District and Piccadilly and was closed in 1934 when a new station, Osterley, was opened to the west.

History

The station was opened by the District line's predecessor, the District Railway (DR), on 1 May 1883 on its line to Hounslow Town (located on Hounslow High Street, but now closed). The station was on Thornbury Road east of the current Osterley station and served Osterley Park and a residential estate to the south named "Spring Grove".

On 21 July 1884 a branch was constructed from shortly north of Hounslow Town to Hounslow Barracks (now Hounslow West). The branch line was constructed as single track and initially had no intermediate stations between the terminus and Osterley & Spring Grove. Until 31 March 1886 passengers travelling west from Osterley & Spring Grove could go to either Hounslow Barracks or Hounslow Town. On that date Hounslow Town station closed and a new station, Heston & Hounslow (now Hounslow Central), opened to the west.

Electrification of the DR's tracks took place between 1903 and 1905 with electric trains replacing steam trains on the Hounslow branch from 13 June 1905. When the branch was electrified, the track between Osterley & Spring Grove and Heston & Hounslow was closed and a new loop was opened from Hounslow Town back to Heston & Hounslow. Trains would run from Osterley & Spring Grove to Hounslow Town then reverse and run to Hounslow Barracks.

This method of operation was unsuccessful and short-lived. The old Hounslow Town station and its two loop tracks were closed for good.

Piccadilly line services, which had been running as far as Northfields since January 1933, were extended to run to Hounslow West on 13 March 1933. The station was closed on 24 March 1934, to be replaced the following day by a new Osterley station at a location  to the west on Great West Road. The stairways and platform awnings were removed in 1957, but the platforms and station buildings remain. Since 1967 the latter has been used as a bookshop.

References

Bibliography

External links

 
 
 

Former Metropolitan District Railway stations
Railway stations opened in 1883
Railway stations closed in 1934
Disused London Underground stations
Railway stations in Great Britain opened in the 19th century